State Route 752 (SR 752) is an east–west state highway in the south-central portion of Ohio.

SR 752 was created in the late 1930s.  This two-lane state highway, which runs through the northeastern portion of Pickaway County, is becoming more highly traveled in recent years, as subdivisions are being constructed at a rapid rate in the Teays Valley Local School District.

Route description
The entirety of SR 752 is located in the northeastern quadrant of Pickaway County.  No portion of the highway is included as a part of the National Highway System.

History
SR 752 was designated in 1937, following the alignment that it occupies to this day.  No changes of major significance have taken place to this state route since its inception.

Major intersections

References

752
Transportation in Pickaway County, Ohio